Beijing Institute of Education, founded in 1953 , is a university institution specialized in adult education in Xicheng District, Beijing, China under the provincial government.

External links
Official website

Beiyan Institute and Beijing Institute of Education programs : http://www.sinolingua.org/ *Official website

Universities and colleges in Beijing
Teachers colleges in China
Educational institutions established in 1953
1953 establishments in China